TVS iQube Electric is an electric scooter manufactured by TVS Motor Company. It was launched in January, 2020 with a limited number of dealerships in Bangalore and now available in 22 cities across India.

The TVS iQube is powered by a 4.4 kWh electric hub mounted motor that makes 140 Nm of torque and it delivers a pick-up of 0 to 40 km/h in 4.2 seconds. The scooter has a max speed of 78 km/h and a range of 100km/charge.

The TVS iQube is equipped with a Combined Braking System (CBS) that provides efficient and safe braking performance. CBS ensures that both the front and rear brakes apply simultaneously when the rider hits the brakes, shortening braking distances and improving stability. Read More

Activities

2021 - September - On World EV Day, TVS iQube was launched in 22 new cities.

2021 - October - TVS Motor partnered with Tata Power to expansion of EV charging network across the country.

2022 - January - TVS Motor Company partnered with Swiggy to deploy TVS iQube electric scooter across India.

2022 - April - TVS Motor announced a partnership with Jio-BP to set up charging infrastructure across India.

References

Indian motor scooters
TVS motorcycles
Motorcycles introduced in 2020